

Events
September 12 – Australian radio station ABC Classic FM reveals the results of its Classic 100 Symphony poll.  The winner is Dvořák's Symphony no. 9 – From the New World.
October – With the release of his new album Nightbook, Ludovico Einaudi takes a new direction, incorporating synthesized sounds alongside his solo piano playing.

New works
John Adams – String Quartet No. 2
Thomas Adès – Lieux Retrouvés, for cello and piano
Kalevi Aho – Hommage á Schubert, string quintet
Richard Barrett – Mesopotamia for 17 instruments and electronics
Harrison Birtwistle – The Corridor, scena for two singers and ensemble
John Brunning – Sahara, for guitar
Elliott Carter
Duettino, for violin and cello
Figment V, for marimba
Ludovico Einaudi – Nightbook
Lorenzo Ferrero
Op.111 – Bagatella su Beethoven, for piano solo
Concerto for Piano and Orchestra No. 2
Fantasy Suite No. 2, for violin and orchestra
Three Simple Songs, for flute, clarinet, violin, violoncello and piano
Tourists and Oracles, for eleven instruments and piano four-hands
Francesco Filidei – Ogni gesto d'amore, for violoncello and orchestra 
Howard Goodall – Enchanted Voices
Philip Glass
Concerto for Violin and Orchestra, No. 2, "The American Four Seasons", premiere in December
Sonata for Violin and Piano
String Sextet
Sofia Gubaidulina – Fachwerk, for bayan, percussion and string orchestra
Mehdi Hosseini
Baluch, for alto flute, contrabassoon, horn, xylophone, violin and cello
Peshtpa, for oboe, bass clarinet and violoncello
Magnus Lindberg – Graffiti, for chorus and orchestra
Frederik Magle – Symphonic suite Cantabile, premiere June 10 in Koncerthuset, Copenhagen
Christopher Rouse – Odna Zhizn
David Sawer – Rumpelstiltskin
Steven Stucky – Dust Devil, for solo marimba
John Tavener
Tu ne sais pas, for mezzo-soprano, timpani and stings
The Peace that Passeth Understanding, for choir
Mark-Anthony Turnage – Five Processionals, for clarinet, violin, cello and piano

Opera premieres
Operas which premiered in 2009 include:
Kepler by Philip Glass, September 20, Landesthater Linz, Austria
Aquarius by Karel Goeyvaerts, June 9, Antwerp
The Letter by Paul Moravec, July 25, Santa Fe Opera
Sparkie: Cage and Beyond by Michael Nyman, with Carsten Nicolai
Brief Encounter by André Previn, May 1, Houston Grand Opera
The Lunch Box by Thanapoom Sirichang, March 26, Hobart, Tasmania
Prima Donna by Rufus Wainwright, July, Palace Theatre, Manchester

Albums
Nicola Benedetti – Fantasie
Bradley Joseph – Suites & Sweets
Julian Lloyd Webber – Romantic Cello Concertos
Hayley Westenra – Winter Magic

Musical films
La Danse
Mao's Last Dancer
Pianomania
The Soloist

Deaths
January 13 – Mansour Rahbani, 83, Lebanese composer
January 14 – Angela Morley, 84, English conductor and composer
January 15 – Veronica Dudarova, 92, Russian symphony conductor
January 23 – George Perle, 93, American composer and theorist
January 31 – Erland von Koch, 98, Swedish composer
February 1 – Lukas Foss, 86, American pianist, conductor and composer
February 24
Svatopluk Havelka, 83, Czech composer
Pearl Lang, 87, American dancer and choreographer
March 29 – Maurice Jarre, 84, French composer
April 10 – Richard Arnell, 91, English composer
June 22 – Betty Allen, 82, American mezzo-soprano
July 16 – D. K. Pattammal, 90, Indian classical singer
July 27– George Russell, 86, American composer
August 18 – Hildegard Behrens, 72, German opera singer
September 1 – Erich Kunzel, 74, American conductor
September 17 – Leon Kirchner, 90, American composer
October 12 – Ian Wallace, 90, British singer

Major awards

Classical Brits
Male of the Year — Gustavo Dudamel
Female of the Year — Alison Balsom
Composer of the Year — Howard Goodall
Young British Classical Performer — Alina Ibragimova
Album of the Year — Royal Scots Dragoon Guards Spirit of the Glen–Journey
Soundtrack of the Year — The Dark Knight — Hans Zimmer and James Newton Howard
Critics' Award — Sir Charles Mackerras/Scottish Chamber Orchestra — Mozart Symphonies nos. 38–41
Lifetime Achievement In Music — José Carreras

Grammy Awards
See 51st Grammy Awards

See also
 2009 in music

References

Clssical
Classical music by year